Bāghmisheh or Bāghmasha is one of the historic districts of Tabriz, Iran, located in the north-eastern part of the city.

See also
Baghmisheh gate

Districts of Tabriz